Timothy Noble (born 1966) and Susan Webster (born 1967), are British artists who work as a collaborative duo. They are associated with the post-YBA generation of artists.

Early lives and careers
Noble and Webster attended fine art foundation courses at Cheltenham Art College (now the University of Gloucestershire) and Leicester Polytechnic (now De Montfort University) respectively. The two first met in 1986 as Fine Art students at Nottingham Trent University, became good friends through shared interests, particularly their tastes in music.

Their work features in a number of public collections, including the National Portrait Gallery, London, the Arken Museum of Modern Art, Denmark and the Solomon R. Guggenheim Museum, New York.

In 2007, they were awarded the prestigious Arken Prize, and in 2009 they received Honorary Doctorates of Art from Nottingham Trent University, their former college, in acknowledgement of their artistic achievements to date.

The artists are currently represented by BlainSouthern in London.

Work
Tim Noble and Sue Webster's work can be divided into the 'Light Works' and the 'Shadow Works', though Webster does not see them as completely separate. She says:

The influence of music on their art, particularly punk rock, has been of great importance to them since they began their earliest collaborations: Says Noble:

Adds Webster:

Sir Norman Rosenthal, the former Exhibitions Secretary of the Royal Academy, writes:

Shadow sculptures
The Shadow Sculptures incorporate diverse materials including household rubbish, scrap metal and taxidermy animals. By shining light onto these assemblages they are transformed into highly accurate shadow profiles of the artists.

Discussing their shadow works, Webster commented: "Our work is incredibly unsocial. There has to be complete darkness because you need to give the light and then to take it away again."

Their first shadow sculpture, 'Miss Understood and Mr Meanor', 1997 (right), came into existence through experimentation with the assemblage of personal items and domestic trash. The silhouettes are formed by lights shining on mounds of rubbish, which includes broken sunglasses and pin badges for rock bands. In this particular work the artist's heads are severed and impaled on stakes. The work was destroyed in the 2004 Momart warehouse fire, along with a number of other well-known works from the Saatchi Collection.

Through their shadow sculptures they managed to fuse the abstract and the representational, a pursuit that consumed the likes of Jackson Pollock, Willem de Kooning and Francis Bacon. This became even more apparent with their second major shadow sculpture, 'Dirty White Trash (with Gulls)', 1998 (left), which expanded the innovations of 'Miss Understood and Mr Meanor'. This work is composed of a new kind of self-portrait, sculpted out of six months' worth of the artists' rubbish; the remains of everything they needed to survive during the time it took to make the work. A single light source illuminates the pile of rubbish thus casting a portrait in shadow, which contrasts sharply with the materials used to create it; the artists leaning against each other, back to back, enjoying a glass of wine and a cigarette.

Jeffrey Deitch, the director of the Los Angeles Museum of Contemporary Art, writes:

Another work, 'British Wildlife' was created after Noble's father died in 2000. Using his collection of taxidermy animals, it is an assemblage of forty-six birds, forty mammals, and two stuffed fish, including a whole swan and even the pet crow Noble kept as a child. The shadow formed by this mass of animals fittingly depicts back to back busts of the artists in a pose of grief.

In September 2000, they were invited to participate in 'Apocalypse', the Royal Academy's follow up to the infamous Sensation exhibition of 1997. For this they presented 'The Undesirables', which comprises a mountain of detritus collected from outside Tim and Sue's house with a shadow image of the artists hovering above. The appearance of a huge pile of rubbish in one of the largest galleries within the Royal Academy was intentionally radical and shocking, created to challenge viewers' assumptions about art.

In 2006, an exhibition of their work was held at the Freud Museum, entitled 'Polymorphous Perverse'.'Black Narcissus', a sculpture made of black silicone casts of Webster's fingers and Noble's penis in various states of arousal, was placed in Sigmund Freud's study next to a bust of Freud himself. When illuminated the sculpture cast a double profile portrait of the artists, illustrating how sexuality influences our perception of reality reflecting the sexuality that Freud discovered at the core of human life. Another work, 'Scarlett', 2006 (see below video on 'External link') was a "worktable on which numerous bizarre mechanical toys are working and seemingly in the process of being made; a nightmarish setting of repressed sexual and sadomasochistic fantasies and transgressions."

Light sculptures
The light sculptures, created in tandem with their shadow investigations, are constructed out of computer sequenced light-bulbs that perpetually flash, sending out messages of, often simultaneous, love and hate. The sculptures reference the iconic pop culture symbols of Britain and America, recalling carnival shows and signage typical of working-class sea-side Britain, Piccadilly Circus, Las Vegas and Times Square.

As with almost all of their work, many of the Light Sculptures are meant to be contradictory, and to produce conflicting feelings in the viewer. This is certainly the case with their early light sculpture, 'Toxic Schizophrenia', 1997. The relentlessly flashing heart with a knife stuck through it fuses a Christian emblem with a cliché rock 'n' roll tattoo. As with the shadow sculptures, duality lies at its core; the work represents romance and pain, love and hate, friendship and alienation, negative and positive.

The same contradictions resonate at the centre of their later work, 'Sacrificial Heart', 2008, a three-dimensional rotating version of 'Toxic Schizophrenia', which, like the earlier work, is both repellent and strangely alluring.'Toxic Schizophrenia (Hyper Version)' was their first permanent public sculpture, unveiled at the Museum of Contemporary Art, Denver, May 2009.

Contradictions and irony abound in the works exhibited at the Gagosian, Beverley Hills exhibition, 'Instant Gratification', 2001. The twenty foot long revision of their original 1997 'Forever' is inextricably linked to the artist's earlier trips to Las Vegas, playing with the traditional connotations of the word, as the constantly flashing lights reinforce the idea of 'forever'.

With 'A Pair of Dollars' they attempted to form an ironic response to the art market and art fairs, creating what Noble described as a 'vulgar' artwork, to demonstrate their annoyance with this system. However, he has since acknowledged the failure of this irony, due to the huge success of the piece.

'Puny Undernourished Kid & Girlfriend from Hell' (Puny Undernourished Kid shown left), represents another return to earlier work, as it derives from cartoon-like drawings that Noble and Webster had made of each other ten years before. These large neon figures are covered with neon tattoos of aggressive and forceful statements, clearly demonstrating the influence of punk rock on the artists.

Metal sculptures
'The Crack' (2004), is one in a series of welded metal sculptures which appear at first glance as abstract works in the tradition of David Smith and Anthony Caro, while they actually work to reverse this abstraction into figuration.

'The Crack', a vertical column-like form, is possibly the most difficult of the artists' shadow works to decipher. Instead of focusing on the usual black silhouettes cast on the wall, the viewer must instead focus on the white space around the shadow, which reveals the naked bodies of the artists facing each other. This perceptual challenge brings to mind Ernst Gombrich's discussion of perception in his famous 1960 book, 'Art and Illusion'. 'The Crack' displays at one moment an abstract shape that is perhaps reminiscent of a heroic mountain landscape by Clyfford Still, with its cracks and gullies; gradually we begin to perceive the full-length naked profiles of our friends approaching each other, nipples touching, as though they are about to make love again for the millionth time.The New Barbarians
In 1997, Tim Noble and Sue Webster commissioned a sculptor from Madame Tussauds to help them create a life-size sculpture of themselves as australopithecines. Called 'The New Barbarians' (left), the work is based upon a diorama at the American Museum of Natural History, New York, which shows a reconstruction of two early ancestors of the human species. The artists produced a version of these figures overlaid with their own facial features. The sculptures are installed so that they stand in isolation in an apparently infinite space. Their hairlessness evokes conflicting connotations; they could be the first humans or the last – cave people, or the survivors of a nuclear holocaust. Thus, the work continues the artist's concern with conflicting themes of impermanence and immortality. A year after beginning 'The New Barbarians' they made another version of the work, 'Masters of the Universe', 1998–2000. This uses the same sculptural model as the earlier work but is covered with hair.

Electric Fountain
The 35-foot tall 'Electric Fountain', constructed from steel, neon tubing and 3,390 LED bulbs, was exhibited at Rockefeller Plaza, New York, February 2008. 'Electric Fountain' (see 'External links' below for video clip) represents the artist's take on the world's oldest form of public art, the fountain. Said Webster: "Electric Fountain mimics the tradition of a fountain as a monument found in public squares around the world, but its magic lies in the emulation of light where water should be." The fountain can be seen as both a celebration of contemporary culture and an ambiguous comment on the nature of consumer society, embodying themes that are often present in the duo's work.

The Dirty House
In 2001, Tim Noble and Sue Webster bought a dilapidated early twentieth-century furniture factory in the East End of London, which would become their studio space. The artists commissioned David Adjaye to design the building, which he named 'The Dirty House', a reference to the medium they use in many of their works. The original brickwork was painted a dark brown, offset by two rows of window openings, and a 'floating' roof that appears to hover over the upper level of glazing and recessed decks.<ref>Bradbury, Dominic "From Architect to Starchitect" The Telegraph", 27 June 2007</ref>

Personal lives
Noble and Webster were married on 7 June 2008. The wedding party was held on board the Queen Elizabeth, the boat that was used for the Sex Pistols' infamous 'Jubilee party'; also held on the same day as the Pistols' party, 31 years later. The service was conducted by their friend and fellow artist Tracey Emin.

It was announced on 4 January 2013, that after 20 years together, Noble and Webster were to divorce.

See also
Henry Hudson (artist)
Nimrod Kamer
Marc Quinn

 Tim Mackie -Sermon on the Mount (at 14min:45 sec)

Selected bibliography
 
 
 
 
 ''British Rubbish will be published by Rizzoli in Autumn 2011

See also
What Do Artists Do All Day?

References

1966 births
1967 births
Living people
Art duos
Married couples
English contemporary artists
Recycled art artists